Dyschoriste is a genus of flowering plants in the family Acanthaceae. Members of the genus are commonly known as snakeherb.

Etymology
The name comes from the Greek δυσ, poorly, and χωριστός, to split, in reference to the slightly lobed stigma.

Selected species
Dyschoriste angusta (A.Gray) Small – Pineland snakeherb
Dyschoriste crenulata Kobuski – Wavyleaf snakeherb
Dyschoriste hondurensis Leonard
Dyschoriste decumbens (A.Gray) Kuntze – Spreading snakeherb
Dyschoriste hirsutissima  (Nees) Kuntze – Swamp snakeherb
Dyschoriste humistrata (Michx.) Kuntze – Swamp snakeherb
Dyschoriste jaliscensis Kobuski
Dyschoriste linearis (Torr. & A.Gray) Kuntze – Narrowleaf snakeherb
Dyschoriste oaxacensis Kobuski
Dyschoriste oblongifolia (Michx.) Kuntze – Oblongleaf snakeherb
Dyschoriste radicans
Dyschoriste rubiginosa Rama. & Wash. (D. angustifolia) 
Dyschoriste xylopoda Kobuski
Dyschorite microphylla

References

External links

Acanthaceae
Acanthaceae genera